Josia is a genus of moths of the family Notodontidae erected by Jacob Hübner in 1819.

Species
This genus consists of the following species:

Josia auriflua Walker, 1864
Josia aurifusa Walker, 1854
Josia frigida Druce, 1885
Josia fusigera Walker, 1864
Josia fustula Warren, 1901
Josia gigantea (Druce, 1885)
Josia infausta Hering, 1925
Josia insincera Prout, 1918
Josia integra Walker, 1854
Josia interrupta Warren, 1901
Josia ligata Walker, 1864
Josia ligula (Hübner, 1806) 
Josia megaera (Fabricius, 1787) 
Josia mononeura (Hübner, 1806) 
Josia neblina Miller, 2009
Josia oribia Druce, 1885
Josia radians Warren, 1905
Josia similis Hering, 1925
Josia subcuneifera Dognin, 1902
Josia turgida Warren, 1905

Josia lativitta Walker, 1869 is only known from an illustration and discussions in the historical literature. Miller (2009) was unable to locate the holotype. He suggests that it may be a synonym of Josia ligula.

References

Notodontidae of South America